Events from the year 1876 in Canada.

Incumbents

Crown 
 Monarch – Victoria

Federal government 
 Governor General – Frederick Hamilton-Temple-Blackwood 
 Prime Minister – Alexander Mackenzie
 Chief Justice – William Buell Richards (Ontario) 
 Parliament – 3rd

Provincial governments

Lieutenant governors 
Lieutenant Governor of British Columbia – Joseph Trutch (until June 27) then Albert Norton Richards  
Lieutenant Governor of Manitoba – Alexander Morris
Lieutenant Governor of New Brunswick – Samuel Leonard Tilley
Lieutenant Governor of the North-West Territories – David Laird (from October 7)
Lieutenant Governor of Nova Scotia – Adams George Archibald     
Lieutenant Governor of Ontario – Donald Alexander Macdonald   
Lieutenant Governor of Prince Edward Island – Robert Hodgson  
Lieutenant Governor of Quebec – René-Édouard Caron (until December 13) then Luc Letellier de St-Just (from December 15)

Premiers    
Premier of British Columbia – George Anthony Walkem (until February 1) then Andrew Charles Elliott   
Premier of Manitoba – Robert Atkinson Davis  
Premier of New Brunswick – George Edwin King   
Premier of Nova Scotia – Philip Carteret Hill   
Premier of Ontario – Oliver Mowat    
Premier of Prince Edward Island – Lemuel Cambridge Owen (until August 1) then Louis Henry Davies 
Premier of Quebec – Charles Boucher de Boucherville

Territorial governments

Lieutenant governors 
 Lieutenant Governor of Keewatin – Alexander Morris (from October 7)
 Lieutenant Governor of the Northwest Territories – Alexander Morris then David Laird

Events
January 1 – The building of Fredericton City Hall is completed
February 1 – Andrew Elliott becomes premier of British Columbia, replacing George Walkem
April 12 - The Indian Act is passed. Consolidating and expanding on existing Canadian laws, it defines the special status and land regulations of Aboriginal peoples in Canada who live on reserves; status Indians have no vote in Canadian elections and are exempt from taxes
July 1 – The Intercolonial Railway connecting central Canada to the Maritimes is completed
August – Sir Louis Henry Davies becomes Premier of Prince Edward Island, replacing Lemuel Cambridge Owen
August 10 – The world's first long-distance phone call connects the Bell residence with a shoe and boot store in nearby Paris, Ontario.
October 7 – The District of Keewatin (incorporating the disputed area between Ontario and Manitoba) is separated from the North-West Territories.
October 10 – 1876 Prince Edward Island election: Lemuel Cambridge Owen's Conservatives win a second consecutive majority

Full date unknown
The Toronto Women's Literary Club is founded as a front for the suffrage movement.
The Legislative Council of Manitoba is abolished, and the legislature becomes unicameral.

Sport 
September 20 – The Ottawa Football Club (Ottawa Rough Riders) is established.

Births

January to June
January 8 – Matthew Robert Blake, politician (died 1937)
January 21 – James Charles Brady, politician (died 1962)
January 27 – Frank S. Cahill, politician (died 1934)
April 3 – Margaret Anglin, actress, director and producer (died 1958)
April 21 – William Henry Wright, prospector and newspaper owner (died 1951)
June 17 – Thomas Crerar, politician and Minister (died 1975)

July to December
August 23 – William Melville Martin, politician and Premier of Saskatchewan (died 1970)
September 6 – John James Richard Macleod, physician, physiologist and Nobel laureate (died 1935)
October 6 – Ernest Lapointe, politician (died 1941)
November 18 – Walter Seymour Allward, sculptor (died 1955)
December 9 – Berton Churchill, actor (died 1940)

Deaths
February 4 – Charles-Séraphin Rodier, mayor of Montreal (born 1797)
February 5 – George Ryan, politician (born 1806)
April 5 – Élisabeth Bruyère, nun (born 1818)
June 1 – Malcolm Cameron, businessman and politician (born 1808)
July 3 – Aldis Bernard, mayor of Montreal (born 1810)
July 27 – Thomas-Louis Connolly, Archbishop of Halifax (born 1814)
October 2 – Louis-Ovide Brunet, priest and botanist (born 1826)
October 6 – John Young, 1st Baron Lisgar, Governor General (born 1807)
December 13 – René-Édouard Caron, 2 Mayor of Quebec City and 2nd Lieutenant-Governor of Quebec (born 1800)

Full date unknown
Edward Feild, Church of England clergyman, inspector of schools, bishop of Newfoundland (born 1801)
Wilson Ruffin Abbott, businessman and landowner (born 1801)

Historical documents
Bell's Ontario experiments lead to the first long-distance telephone conversation

Treaty 6 annexes land of Cree and other nations in exchange for reserves subject to sale or development, plus money and supplies

Mark Twain's anger at a Canadian firm publishing The Adventures of Tom Sawyer without permission

Emigrant's guide written especially for "people of small fortune"

References
  

 
Years of the 19th century in Canada
Canada
1876 in North America